Peter Arnesson (born 23 June 1980) is a Swedish ski-orienteering competitor. He won a bronze medal in the sprint distance at the 2004 World Ski Orienteering Championships in Åsarna/Östersund in Sweden, and placed fourth with the Swedish relay team, and fifth in the middle distance. He placed overall second in the World Cup in Ski Orienteering in the 2007/2008 season.

References

External links
 
 Peter Arnesson at World of O Runners

Swedish orienteers
Male orienteers
Ski-orienteers
1980 births
Living people